Superstar Car Wash is the fourth studio album by American rock band Goo Goo Dolls, released in February, 1993 on Warner Bros. John Rzeznik wrote the song "We Are the Normal" with his idol, The Replacements' singer Paul Westerberg. The two corresponded by mail but never sat in a studio together. The song "Fallin' Down" was featured in the 1993 Pauly Shore movie Son In Law. Also, the song "So Far Away" was originally written and recorded with the title "Dancing In Your Blood"; the song had the same basic structure, but different lyrics, more minimal instrumentation, and a slightly different melody.

Superstar Car Wash was an actual car washing business on William Street just outside the downtown region of Buffalo, the hometown of the band.

Remixed versions of songs "Fallin' Down", "Another Second Time Around", "Cuz You're Gone", "We Are The Normal", "Girl Right Next To Me", "Lucky Star", and "On The Lie" appear in the 2001's compilation What I Learned About Ego, Opinion, Art & Commerce. These mixes sound slightly different from their original versions, with crisper and clearer background noises, such as accompanying acoustic guitars and choruses which have been emphasized.

Musical style
Billboard described the album's sound as a mix of punk rock, pop and metal. The New York Times thought that the album mostly "[remained] in familiar power-pop territory", but also had "occasional ventures toward metal or punk." Buffalo News called the album an "alternative-pop masterpiece", stating that the band had "taken their heavy metal, punk and garage rock roots and combined them with a softer pop style." Vice described the album as simply hard rock.

Reception
The album was met with highly positive critical reception. AllMusic gave the album four-out-of-five stars saying that the band let loose and channeled their playful immaturity throughout the attractive impurity of this album." Entertainment Weekly gave the album an 'A' rating. Rock Hard rated the album 8-out-of-10, saying that the band "have an arrow in their quiver that might hit the mark this time." The Chicago Tribune gave the album a 3.5/4.

Track listing 
All songs written by The Goo Goo Dolls (Johnny Rzeznik, Robby Takac and George Tutuska) except when noted.

Personnel
 Johnny Rzeznik – lead and rhythm guitar, lead and backing vocals
 Robby Takac – bass guitar, backing vocals, lead vocals 
 George Tutuska – drums
 Mary Ramsey – Viola on We Are The Normal

Charts

References

Goo Goo Dolls albums
1993 albums
Warner Records albums
Punk rock albums by American artists
Power pop albums by American artists
Hard rock albums by American artists